The Minor League Baseball Yearly (MiLBY) Awards are given annually to the most outstanding players, teams, single-game performances, plays, moments, homers, and promotions of the year. Baseball fans select the nominees for and winners of the awards, via the online voting system on MiLB.com, the official website of Minor League Baseball.

2005–2009
2005
See footnote
Offensive Player: Brandon Wood, R. Cucamonga
Starting Pitcher: Justin Verlander, Lakeland
Relief Pitcher: Jermaine Van Buren, Iowa
Foreign-Born Player: Francisco Liriano, Rochester
Breakthrough Performer: Rich Hill, Iowa
Team: Jacksonville Suns
Single-Game Performance: Ian Snell, Indianapolis

2006
See footnote

2007
See footnote

2008
See footnote
Overall Best Hitter: Matt Wieters, (Baltimore Orioles)
Overall Best Starter: Jhoulys Chacín, (Colorado Rockies)
Overall Best Reliever: Rob Delaney (Minnesota Twins)
Overall Best Single-Game Performance: Micah Hoffpauir (Chicago Cubs)
Overall Best Team: Augusta GreenJackets (San Francisco Giants)

2009
See footnote
Overall Best Hitter: Chris Carter (Oakland A's)
Best Hitter (Triple-A):
Best Hitter (Double-A):
Best Hitter (Class A Advanced):
Best Hitter (Class A):
Best Hitter (Short Season):
Overall Best Starter: Dan Hudson (Chicago White Sox)
Best Starter (Triple-A):
Best Starter (Double-A):
Best Starter (Class A Advanced):
Best Starter (Class A):
Best Starter (Short Season):
Overall Best Reliever: Dan Runzler (San Francisco Giants)
Best Reliever (Triple-A):
Best Reliever (Double-A):
Best Reliever (Class A Advanced):
Best Reliever (Class A):
Best Reliever (Short Season):
Overall Best Single Game: Jeanmar Gómez (Cleveland Indians)
Best Single Game (Triple-A):
Best Single Game (Double-A):
Best Single Game (Class A Advanced):
Best Single Game (Class A):
Best Single Game (Short Season):
Overall Best Team: Fort Wayne TinCaps (San Diego Padres)
Best Team (Triple-A):
Best Team (Double-A):
Best Team (Class A Advanced):
Best Team (Class A):
Best Team (Short Season):

2010–2014
2010
See footnote
Best Starter (Triple-A): Brandon Dickson, Memphis
Best Starter (Double-A): Elih Villanueva, Jacksonville
Best Starter (Class A Advanced): Anthony Bass, Lake Elsinore
Best Starter (Class A – Full Season): Matt Magill, Great Lakes
Best Starter (Class A – Short Season): Yohan Almonte, Brooklyn
Best Hitter (Triple-A): Brad Snyder, Iowa
Best Hitter (Double-A): Tagg Bozied, Reading
Best Hitter (Class A Advanced): Tyler Moore, Potomac
Best Hitter (Class A – Full Season): J. D. Martinez, Lexington
Best Hitter (Class A – Short Season): Corey Dickerson, Casper
Best Reliever (Triple-A): Jonathan Albaladejo, Scranton/Wilkes-Barre
Best Reliever (Double-A): Brandon Gomes, San Antonio
Best Reliever (Class A Advanced): Matt Daly, Dunedin
Best Reliever (Class A – Full Season): Josh Zeid, Lakewood
Best Reliever (Class A – Short Season): Chase Whitley, Staten Island
Best Single Game (Triple-A): R. A. Dickey, Buffalo
Best Single Game (Double-A): Kyle Drabek, New Hampshire
Best Single Game (Class A Advanced): Nathan Moreau, Frederick
Best Single Game (Class A – Full Season): Jake Brigham, Hickory
Best Single Game (Class A – Short Season): Daniel Adamson, Tri-City
Best Team (Triple-A): Columbus Clippers (International League)
Best Team (Double-A): Trenton Thunder (Eastern League)
Best Team (Class A Advanced): Tampa Yankees (Florida State League)
Best Team (Class A – Full Season): Great Lakes Loons (Midwest League)
Best Team (Class A – Short Season): Helena Brewers (Pioneer League)

2011
''Note: In 2011, MiLB re-named one category ("Game", instead of "Single Game") and added four new categories, for a total of nine categories. In three of the new categories (Play of the Year, Moment of the Year, and Homer of the Year), one overall winner is chosen for all of minor-league baseball. In the fourth new category (Promo of the Year), there are overall winners in each of five subcategories: Best Promotion (of all types), Best Theme Night, Best Giveaway, Best Celebrity Appearance, and Best Miscellaneous Promotion.

Best Starter (Triple-A): Graham Godfrey, Sacramento
Best Starter (Double-A): Garrett Richards, Arkansas
Best Starter (Class A Advanced): Darin Gorski, St. Lucie
Best Starter (Class A – Full Season): Josh Smith, Dayton
Best Starter (Class A – Short Season): Brennan Smith, Connecticut
Best Hitter (Triple-A): Bryan LaHair, Iowa
Best Hitter (Double-A): Tim Wheeler, Tulsa
Best Hitter (Class A Advanced): Ian Gac, Winston-Salem
Best Hitter (Class A – Full Season): Derek Dietrich, Bowling Green
Best Hitter (Class A – Short Season): Taylor Lindsey, Orem
Best Reliever (Triple-A): Rob Delaney, Durham
Best Reliever (Double-A): Cory Burns, Akron
Best Reliever (Class A Advanced): Preston Guilmet, Kinston
Best Reliever (Class A – Full Season): Drew Hayes, Dayton
Best Reliever (Class A – Short Season): Logan Billbrough, Johnson City
Best Team (Triple-A): Columbus Clippers (International League)
Best Team (Double-A): New Hampshire Fisher Cats (Eastern League)
Best Team (Class A Advanced): Kinston Indians (Carolina League)
Best Team (Class A – Full Season): Greensboro Grasshoppers (South Atlantic League)
Best Team (Class A – Short Season): Vancouver Canadians (Northwest League)

See also

Baseball America minor-league awards
Esurance MLB Awards (formerly "This Year in Baseball Awards" and then the "GIBBY Awards") (Major League Baseball)
Player of the year awards
 Baseball America Minor League Player of the Year Award
 The Sporting News Minor League Player of the Year Award
 USA Today Minor League Player of the Year Award
 Topps Minor League Player of the Year Award

References

 
Awards established in 2005